William Peyto may refer to:

William Petow or Peyto, cardinal
William Peyto (died 1464) (c. 1394–1464), MP for Warwickshire, 1420
William Peyto (died 1734) (c. 1698–1734), MP for Warwickshire, 1715–34